BuzzNet is a photo, journal, and video-sharing social media network, currently owned by Hive Media. The network was owned by SpinMedia (formerly Buzz Media) from its inception until September 2016. Like other social networking services, Buzznet is a platform for members to share content based on their personal interests. Unlike other social networking services that focus primarily on messaging and profile pages, Buzznet members participate in communities that are created around ideas, events and interests, most predominantly music, celebrities, and the media.

History
Buzznet.com was founded by Marc Brown, Steve Haldane, Kevin Woolery and Anthony Batt (CEO). The site was officially launched in 2005 when the company received private funding from Anthem Venture Partners.  Before the end of 2005, newspapers and journalists utilized Buzznet’s photo galleries. Newspapers that joined Buzznet for its photo-sharing capabilities include the Houston Chronicle for Hurricane Rita coverage, the Miami Herald for Hurricane Wilma coverage, and the Biloxi, Miss. Sun-Herald for Hurricane Katrina coverage.

According to a March Hitwise report, in February 2007 Buzznet’s site visits more than doubled. The report deemed Buzznet the fastest growing social media community on the Internet.

In April 2007 Buzznet hosted the official online community for the Coachella Valley Music and Arts Festival. In May 2007 Buzznet received a $6 million round of funding from Redpoint Ventures and previous investors, Anthem Venture Partners.

In March 2008, Buzznet received an additional funding round of $25 million In April 2008, Buzznet announced the acquisition of the popular music blog Stereogum. In May 2008, Buzznet announced a partnership with TheGauntlet.com for its heavy metal music content.  Unlike its other music site buyouts, this is Buzznet's first and only content partnership.

The network was sold to Hive Media in September 2016, along with Idolator and PureVolume.

Features

Homepage content

Buzznet is a website for people to discuss different kinds of music.
Banners displayed on the homepage link to Buzznet’s contest groups and Buzznet polls. Each Buzznet contest is typically endorsed by a band, celebrity, or record label. Past contests include “Get Dressed by Avril” Merch Model Search, endorsed by pop-rock icon, Avril Lavigne, and "Feel the Elite Beat" Dance Video Contest sponsored by Nintendo. The homepage also links to music features, festival updates, and Internet stars.

User pages

User pages are controlled by individual members and can be customized with colors and text. Upon sign in, registered members are prompted to upload videos, photos, or post journals, all of which can be tagged to appropriate tag topic pages.

Tag topic pages

Tag topic pages house all photos, videos, journals, and links that have been tagged to a particular topic. Topics are most commonly a band, celebrity, or content genre. Tag topic pages also have a user-generated forum that hosts open discussions on subjects related to the tag.

Group pages

Group pages have features similar to tag topic pages, but are generally more content-specific and exclusive. Group pages are generally used for contests, events, and fan bases.

Buzz

Members are recognized for their popularity in the Buzznet community based on the amount of buzz they receive. Each photo, video, and journal can receive buzz from other members. Top buzzed members and top content contributors are recognized throughout the site.

Artists (bands)

Bands such as The All-American Rejects, The Maine, All Time Low, My Chemical Romance, Thirty Seconds to Mars, HIM AFI, Cartel, New Found Glory, Boys Like Girls, Blaqk Audio, Anberlin, The Sunpilots, Fall Out Boy, Kerli and Lostprophets  maintain user pages and semi-active blogs on Buzznet.

Buzznet mobile

Users can access Buzznet from a mobile device in four different ways. They can upload content directly via email, with ShoZu, or access their account with mobile and iPhone versions of the site. With the mobile version, users can update their account, upload photos, and post journals.

Partnerships

Buzznet.com has partnered with the Honda Civic Tour and Friends or Enemies. Like Buzznet, Friends or Enemies is a site that facilitates dialogue between bands and their fans. Bands on Friends or Enemies include Fall Out Boy, Cobra Starship, and Gym Class Heroes.

Buzznet.com has also partnered with Tila Tequila to create a separate site called tilashotspot.com.

From May 5, 2008 to March 31, 2016, Buzznet owned AbsolutePunk until it was repurchased by the founder of the website. As of July 2008, Buzznet is partnered with heavy metal site TheGauntlet.com.

Notes

References
 Buzznet Hits Sweet Spot mashable.com. Retrieved on 2008-02-19.

External links
 

American social networking websites